Holy Trinity College (HTC) is a band 1A Roman Catholic girls' secondary school in the Shek Kip Mei area of Hong Kong, near Shek Kip Mei station.

School Name
The school name is a reference to the Holy Trinity within Christianity, referring to the three forms of God.

History 

In 1966, the school was founded as a private school by Sr. Rose Mary, who was principal of the school for 30 years. In 1968, when the school had changed to a private assisted school, the formal opening ceremony was held. In 1973, its matriculation (form 6 and 7) courses were initiated.

On HTC's 10th anniversary, in the year of 1976, the new wing of the campus was opened. Two years later, the school had become a fully subsidized school. In 1984, the school garden was opened.

Stepping into the 90s, the school underwent a series of modernization and improvement. In 1990, the Students' Association was established. In 1993, air-conditioners were installed in the hall. In 1996, upon Sr. Rose Mary's retirement, Sr. Juliana succeeded to be the school principal. On the edge of the century, the school gradually computerized. The school hall was demolished in 2004, in order to build a new annex.
In April, 2011, the school held a 45th anniversary open day.

School Badge
The outline is in lily shape, it is a symbol of purity, in thought, words, deeds and attire. 
The triangle represents trinity, 3 persons in God: spirit of harmony, co-operation, unity and love. 
Circle represents Eternity. That means God has no beginning and no end, and so is friendship. 
Dove is the Holy spirit, endowing grace of wisdom, charity, courage and fortitude.

School Mission
Holy Trinity College was founded in 1966, to carry out the mission of the Sisters of the Precious Blood of providing quality education which aims at the nurturing of the whole person with equal emphasis on academic and character development.

School Spirit
Students strive to imitate the Trinity in building up a strong family spirit of harmony, co-operation, unity and love in school

School Motto
Wisdom——Capacity to seek the truth and to distinguish good and evil

Charity——Kindness of heart that seeks no reward

Courage——Willingness to take up responsibilities and embrace the unknown

Fulfilment——Realization of potentials, mission, and destiny

Class Structure
Holy Trinity College uses English as the medium of instruction in all subjects except Chinese Language, Chinese Literature, Chinese History, Putonghua, Ethics and Civic Education. 
There are 5 classes for F. 1 to F. 6 students. Students in the junior level (F.1-F.3) study a number of core subjects which provide them with a solid foundation of general knowledge. This enables their studies of different subjects in different streams when they enter the senior level. Students are allocated to different classes in the senior level according to their choice and interest as well as their academic performance.

Houses

Past Student's Association 
The Holy Trinity College Past Students' Association [寶血會上智英文書院校友會] was established in 1975. The aims of the Association are:
 To maintain, promote and carry on an association for former and present students of Holy Trinity College (HTC) and to provide assistance to such graduates and students of HTC;
 To maintain and promote friendship amongst former and present students and to afford a means whereby they may be kept in touch with the activities of HTC;
 To assist charitable work or other undertakings for the benefits of HTC;
 To organize and carry on activities of a recreational, social, cultural, educational, civic or religious nature in the best interests of the members of the Association; and
 To foster whenever possible the interests and development of the Alma Mater.

EMI policy 
Holy Trinity College is an EMI (English as the medium of instruction) college, speaking English is compulsory for all students during regular school days at all time including lunchtime and recesses. In this way, we can build up an atmosphere of speaking English in school. All students enjoy using English to communicate and they can speak fluently.
There are five English Speaking Ambassadors in each class and their jobs are to encourage shy classmates to speak in English. Also, they are the agents who will check whether or not their classmates are speaking in English.

See also 
 Education in Hong Kong
 List of secondary schools in Hong Kong

External links 
 Official Website
 Preparation for NSS curriculum

Shek Kip Mei
Girls' schools in Hong Kong
Secondary schools in Hong Kong
Catholic secondary schools in Hong Kong
Educational institutions established in 1966
1966 establishments in Hong Kong